Palaeagama is an extinct genus of neodiapsid reptile from the Late Permian or Early Triassic of South Africa. It is based on an articulated skeleton which was probably found in the Early Triassic Lystrosaurus Assemblage Zone, or potentially the Late Permian Daptocephalus Assemblage Zone. Despite the completeness of the specimen, Palaeagama is considered as a "wildcard" taxon of uncertain affinities due to poor preservation. It was originally considered an "eosuchian" (ancestral to modern reptiles), and later reinterpreted as a lizard ancestor closely related to Paliguana and Saurosternon. Modern studies generally consider it an indeterminate neodiapsid, though a few phylogenetic analyses tentatively support a position at the base of Lepidosauromorpha.

References 

Early Triassic reptiles of Africa
Permian reptiles of Africa
Fossils of South Africa
Fossil taxa described in 1926
Prehistoric reptile genera